Walupt Creek Falls is a relatively obscure, but massive waterfall on Walupt Creek, a large tributary of the Cispus River in Lewis County, Washington, at an elevation of .
The creek begins the drop by falling down a  cascade, then impacts a large, bell-shaped dome and spreads into a wide fan, dropping . The final drop is a gently sloping slide that flows directly into the Cispus River. The feeder river, Walupt Creek, is sourced directly from Walupt Lake which provides a consistent flow throughout the year. The drainage basin of the river is also fairly large.

The cascades total  in height.

References

Landforms of Lewis County, Washington
Waterfalls of Washington (state)
Gifford Pinchot National Forest
Waterfalls of Lewis County, Washington